Rakesh Krishnan (born 23 July 1983) is an Indian cricketer. He is a left-handed batsman and right-arm off-break bowler who has played for Bengal. He was born in Calcutta.

Krishnan made his debut cricketing appearances for the Bengal Under-16s team, batting in and around the opening order. He played five games for the team in the Vijay Merchant Trophy competition of 1998–99, in which Bengal reached the semi-final of the competition, before being eliminated from the competition following a draw against Punjab.

Krishnan made a single first-class appearance for the team, in the Ranji Trophy competition of 2004–05, against Delhi in December 2004. Batting in the upper-middle order, he scored 13 runs in the first innings of the match, and 34 runs in the second.

Krishnan has been playing first-division cricket for the major cricket clubs in Bengal. Currently, he's playing for Mohan Bagan club.
Recently he smashed 101(40) not out in the local club one day competition

External links
Rakesh Krishnan at CricketArchive 

1983 births
Living people
Indian cricketers
Bengal cricketers